Old Cremorne ferry wharf is located on the northern side of Sydney Harbour serving the Sydney suburb of Cremorne. 

Old Cremorne Wharf, in Mosman Bay on the eastern side of Cremorne Point, was built in the nineteenth century, before the 1911 opening of Cremorne Point Wharf with tram connection on the western end of the Point. The original wharf was at the current location of the Sydney Amateur Sailing Club, but was relocated slightly north to its current location before 1905. The wharf has no road access and is only accessible by foot along the Cremorne Point Reserve path.

Services
Old Cremorne wharf is served by Sydney Ferries Mosman Bay services operated by First Fleet class ferries.

Historical gallery

References

External links
 Old Cremorne Wharf at Transport for New South Wales (Archived 13 June 2019)
Old Cremorne Local Area Map Transport for NSW

Ferry wharves in Sydney